Seaver Peters (August 10, 1932 – February 23, 2020) was an American ice hockey player and college athletics administrator. He attended Dartmouth College where he was captain of the men's ice hockey team and graduated in 1954.  He later served as Dartmouth's athletic director from 1967 to 1983. In 2010, he was inducted into the New Hampshire Legends of Hockey Hall of Fame. He died on February 23, 2020, aged 87.

References

1932 births
2020 deaths
Dartmouth Big Green athletic directors
Dartmouth Big Green men's ice hockey players
People from Melrose, Massachusetts
Sportspeople from Middlesex County, Massachusetts
Ice hockey players from Massachusetts